Leucochroma corope is a moth in the family Crambidae. It was described by Stoll in 1781. It is found from the West Indies and Central America (including Mexico, Panama and Costa Rica) to South America (including Suriname and Colombia). It is an introduced species in Florida.

The wingspan is about 23 mm. Adults are on wing from January to June, in August and from November to December in Florida.

References

Moths described in 1781
Spilomelinae